The Tunisian national under-17 basketball team, nicknamed Les Aigles de Carthage (The Eagles of Carthage or The Carthage Eagles), is governed by the Tunisia Basketball Federation (FTBB). It represents the country in international under-17 and under-16 (under age 17 and under age 16) basketball competitions.

Competitive record
 Champions   Runners-up   Third place   Fourth place

Red border color indicates tournament was held on home soil.

FIBA Under-17 Basketball World Cup

FIBA Under-16 African Championship

See also
Tunisia national basketball team
Tunisia men's national under-20 basketball team
Tunisia national under-19 basketball team
Tunisia women's national under-17 basketball team

External links
Official website of the Tunisia Basketball Federation
FIBA Profile
Tunisia Basketball Records at FIBA Archive
Afrobasket – Tunisian Men National Team U16/17

References

Men's national under-16 basketball teams
Men's national under-17 basketball teams
Men
Basketball